Viktor Nikolaevich Denisov (March 8, 1893 – August 3, 1946), best known by the shortened pseudonym Viktor Deni,  was a Russian satirist, cartoonist and poster artist. Deni was one of the major agitprop poster artists of the Bolshevist period (1917–1921).

Biography

Born in Moscow in 1893, Denisov later shortened his surname to Deni. Deni moved to St. Petersburg in 1913 where he established himself as a successful caricaturist, his caricatures appearing in a number of illustrated satirical journals. After the October Revolution Deni worked for the Litizdat (the state publishing house), an agency founded in June 1919 to coordinate the various publishing centres on behalf of the Bolsheviks. He produced nearly 50 political posters during the Russian Civil War, including some of his most well known satirical work. He became one of the major agitprop poster artists of the Bolshevist period (1917–1921). Deni subsequently focused on producing newspaper cartoons that addressed foreign policy issues. During the German–Soviet War (World War II), he returned to the medium of the political poster together with several other prominent poster artists of the Civil War such as Mikhail Cheremnykh and Dmitry Moor.

See also
 List of Soviet poster artists

References

Further reading

 I. A. Sviridova, Viktor Nikolaevich Deni. Moscow: Izobrazitel'noe Iskusstvo, 1978.
 Stephen White, The Bolshevik Poster. New Haven, Conn.: Yale University Press, 1990.

External links
 Biography at Lambiek Comiclopedia.

Russian artists
1893 births
1946 deaths
Russian caricaturists
Russian cartoonists
Russian editorial cartoonists
Writers from Moscow
Russian satirists
Propaganda in the Soviet Union
Russian poster artists
People of the Russian Civil War
Soviet artists